The Whitehaven Ferry is a passenger and automobile cable ferry that crosses the Wicomico River in Whitehaven, Maryland, located to the southwest of Salisbury. The ferry is operated by the Wicomico County Department of Public Works and runs between the community of Whitehaven in Wicomico County to the north and Somerset County in the south. The ferry can carry a maximum of 6 passengers and 3 cars and has a weight limit of 10,000 pounds. The Whitehaven Ferry operates from early morning until the evening every day of the year except Christmas and is free. A ferry has crossed the Wicomico River in the area since 1687. The current ferry is believed to be the oldest continuously operating ferry in the United States. In 2012, the ferry was overhauled and refurbished.

References

Ferries of Maryland
Transportation in Somerset County, Maryland
Transportation in Wicomico County, Maryland
Whitehaven, Maryland
Cable ferries in the United States